The Marc Tanner Band was a west coast rock band fronted by Marc Tanner, that released two albums on the Elektra label. They had a small hit with the song "Elena" in 1979.

Background
During their time the band released two albums, No Escape in 1979 and Temptation in 1980. They released two singles in 1979, " Elena" bw "Lady In Blue" and "She's So High" bw "Never Again". They released two more the following year which were, "Hold Your Head Up" bw "Don't Say No (Surrender)", and "Hot And Cold" bw "Temptation" in 1980.

Career
By February 1979, the group's debut album No Escape was released on Elektra, supported by the single "Elena".<ref name="Page 1">Billboard, February 17, 1979 - Page 1</ref> Among the musicians that appeared on the album were William "Smitty" Smith, formerly of the group Motherlode and Vanetta Fields.Sessiondays - 1979 Marc Tanner Band – No Escape

For the week ending April 7, 1979, their single "Elena" had moved up from previous weeks position of 53 to 45, with "I Will Survive" by Gloria Gaynor at no 1. Also in April that year with a line up that had been together for two months, the band appeared at the Golden Bear in Huntington Beach, playing a 51-minute set. Billboard reviewer Eliot Tiegel commented on the intensity of the band with the bass, 2 guitars and drums drowning out the other instruments, with a suggesting that this promising band should respect the beauty of its instruments rather than concentrate on the wattage output. In May 1979, Billboard had recommended "She's So High" as a top single pick. Towards the end of May their record label was wrapping up a promo for the band's album No Escape. The marketing ploy had given out ten thousand tie clips in the form of handcuffs.  There were also requests for the items from the nontraditional outlets, usually retail stores and radio. These were restaurants and night clubs. There was also an agenda to promote "Never Again" as a single.

It was reported in the September 29 issue of Billboard that the group were working on a new album. The group's second album Temptation was more towards band album in comparison to the previous which leaned towards a Marc Tanner solo album.

The band was managed by Lewis Kaplan who also managed Carole King's daughter Louise Goffin.

Later years
Tanner has since embarked on a career in production and songwriting and is currently executive producer of a broadway play.

"Elena" is featured on the 4 CD compilation California Groove II'', released in 2010.

Members
 Marc Tanner - vocals
 Linda Stanley - vocals
 Steve Mann - flute, saxophone
 Stephen Lyle - keyboards
 Michael Stevens - lead guitar
 Irvin Kramer - guitar
 Ronny Edwards - bass
 Joe Romersa - drums

Discography

References

Rock music groups from California
Musical groups from California
Musical groups established in 1979
Musical groups disestablished in 1980